Frederick Renshaw "Doc" Wallace (September 20, 1893 – December 31, 1963) was a Major League Baseball Shortstop. Wallace played for Philadelphia Phillies in the 1919 season. He played just two games in his career, having one hit in four at-bats.

Wallace was born in Church Hill, Maryland to William David Wallace and Lyda Potts Wallace. He was educated in Chestertown, Maryland at a middle and upper school which eventually became Washington College.  After graduating from Washington College in 1917, he joined the US Army, eventually becoming a sergeant with the 836 Aero Squadron. During his one year of active duty, until the end of WWI, he implemented an intramural sport program to heighten morale between platoons. He was awarded a medal by Queen Mary in Westminster Cathedral for these actions and said years later, "It was the longest mile I’ve ever walked."

After the war, he was recruited by the Philadelphia Phillies and played one season as shortstop. From 1920 to 1924 he managed minor league baseball teams until becoming Director of Athletics at The St. Luke's School for Boys for boys in Wayne, Pennsylvania, a Philadelphia suburb. During the Summer of 1923, he attended the summer program in Education at the University of Michigan at Ann Arbor and in 1927, he joined the Staff at the Haverford School for Boys. It was here that he remained the athletic director and a master of Math and History for the upper grades for 36 years.

In 1951 he went to the Far East with two other athletic consultants to teach the game of baseball. At about that time, he was elected President of the Eastern Ivy League Collegiate Football Association.

He was on the Vestry of the Bryn Mawr Presbyterian Church for many years and a football linesman referee for five Army/Navy games. A story teller with a sense of humor he was a guest speaker at many athletic events. He was the Director of two summer camps for boys in Maine during WWII; Camp Allagash and Camp Caribou.

He married Josephine Parham Small Wallace; a direct descendant of the Swansson family, who emigrated to the United States from Sweden on the Kalmar Nyckel in 1634. He had three children: Frederick Renshaw Wallace, Jr., Elizabeth Parham Wallace Perkins, Eugenia Small Wallace Eberle. His younger brother was Major General William J. Wallace (USMC) and Ambassador Graham Martin was his brother-in-law.

Wallace died in Haverford, Pennsylvania.

In 1999 and 2005, he was posthumously inducted into the Washington College Athletic Hall of Fame and the Haverford School Athletic Hall of Fame, respectively.

External links
Baseball-Reference.com page

Philadelphia Phillies players
1893 births
1963 deaths
Baseball players from Maryland
Washington College Shoremen baseball players
United States Army personnel of World War I
United States Army soldiers